Randa Chahal Sabbagh (Arabic: رندا شهال صباغ) was a Lebanese film director, producer and screenwriter.  Chahal was born December 11, 1953 in Tripoli, Lebanon to an Iraqi mother and a Lebanese father.  She died of cancer August 25, 2008 in Paris, France (at age 54).

Awards
National Order of the Cedar (Officer), national decoration, Lebanon, 2003
Nestor Almendros Prize, New York City, 2000

(See below for individual film awards and nominations)

Career
Chahal began her career with documentary films but shifted to feature films by the 1990s, though she retained 'a documentary-maker's nose for contentious subject matter'. She is reported to have said, "You discover in my films a common denominator. You notice that the camera only moves from right to left exactly like Arabic writing."

Chahal served as a jury member at the Venice 64th International Film Festival in the Opera Prima section.

Les Infidèles, a 1997 drama, is about the relationship between a French diplomat and a former Islamist who agrees to turn over the names of his colleagues if the French government will release an imprisoned friend.

Civilisées (A Civilized People) released in 1999, is a black comedy about the Lebanese Civil War, which killed at least 100,000 people. Sabbagh deployed a 'vaudevillian cast' including foreign servants and philanthropists, visiting expatriates, militiamen and criminals – in a profane and dis-unified story mixing elements of absurdist plays. Some 40 minutes of the film was censored for its 'obscenity' and 'uncomplimentary representation of Lebanon during this particularly unsavory spell of its history'. It was subsequently screened only once, at the Beirut International Film Festival.

Chahal became noted in 2003 with The Kite, which received the Silver Lion at the 2003 Venice Film Festival and won several prestigious prizes and international acclaim; the Grand Special Jury Prize, the Cinema for Peace Award and the Laterna Magica Prize. Set in a low-key South Lebanese village, the film is about love, life, death and the absurdity of the Israeli occupation, seen from the perspective of a Druze family separated following the division of their village into two with one half annexed to Israel. The story evolves around an arranged marriage between Lamia, a 16-year-old Lebanese Druze girl, (played by Flavia Bechara) and her Israeli Druze cousin (played by Maher Bsaibes). The drama unfolds under the vigilant yet impotent Israeli-Lebanese border guards; one of whom is played by renowned Lebanese composer, actor and playwright Ziad Rahbani. The Kite is used 'as a metaphor for love and for life at the border', it explores, with depth and sometimes humor, 'the meaning of brides, of the hope they represent for divided families and, sometimes, for divided nations'.

In 2005, Chahal started a new project with the distinguished Lebanese-American Hollywood film-producer Elie Samaha with the working title Too Bad for Them. The film was expected to combine comedy, music, dancing as well as politics, and North-South socio-economic disparities. However, the film was unreleased at the time of her death.

Filmography

Notes

References

 Randa Chahal Website about Randa Chahal

1953 births
2008 deaths
Lebanese emigrants to France
Lebanese film directors
Lebanese women film directors
Deaths from cancer in France
Lebanese Sunni Muslims
People from Tripoli, Lebanon
Officers of the National Order of the Cedar
French Muslims
Lebanese people of Iraqi descent
French people of Iraqi descent